The 2020 Buffalo Bulls football team represented the University at Buffalo in the 2020 NCAA Division I FBS football season. The Bulls were led by sixth-year head coach Lance Leipold and played their home games at the University at Buffalo Stadium as members of the East Division of the Mid-American Conference. In a limited season, which was initially canceled due to the COVID-19 pandemic before being reinstated, the Bulls finished the season 6–1, 5–0 in MAC play to win the East Division. They lost to Ball State in the MAC Championship. They received an invite to the Camelia Bowl where they defeated Marshall.

Following the season, Leipold left the team to coach at Kansas on April 30, 2021. A few days later, the school named Michigan co-defensive coordinator Maurice Linguist the team's new head coach.

Previous season
The Bulls finished the 2019 season 8–5, 5–3 in MAC play to finish in a three-way tie for second place in the East Division, losing the tiebreakers to Kent State and Ohio. The Bulls were invited to the Bahamas Bowl, where they defeated Charlotte for their first bowl game win in program history.

Preseason

Award watch lists

Listed in the order that they were released

Season recap
The Bulls played their first game of 2020 against Northern Illinois in Dekalb, Illinois, on November 4 after a delayed start to the season due to the COVID-19 pandemic. Jaret Patterson ran for 137 yards including for two touchdowns. Quarterback Kyle Vantrease recorded his first two touchdowns of the season with a rushing touchdown and a passing touchdown to Antonio Nunn. The Buffalo defense scored 3 touchdowns on their own with 2 fumble recoveries returned for touchdowns by Tim Terry Jr. and Isaiah King and an interception returned for a touchdown by Kadofi Wright en route to the Bulls 49–30 win.

The Bulls home opener at UB Stadium occurred six days later against the Miami Redhawks. Kevin Marks Jr. ran for 109 yards compared to Jaret Patterson's 73, but with Patterson rushing for 2 touchdowns. Kyle Vantrease completed 4 touchdown passes as Buffalo defeated Miami 42–10. Buffalo received 1 vote in week 12's AP Poll, their first vote received in the poll of the season.

A week later Buffalo went back on the road traveling to Doyt L. Perry Stadium in Bowling Green, Ohio, to take on the Bowling Green Falcons. Jaret Patterson erupted for 301 yards while scoring 4 touchdowns on 31 carries with fellow Buffalo running back Kevin Marks Jr. and quarterback Kyle Vantrease also recording a rushing touchdown each in Buffalo's 42–17 win in Bowling Green. Buffalo received 3 votes in week 13's AP Poll.

The Bulls played their first Saturday game of the season on November 28 against Kent State at UB Stadium. Jaret Patterson rushed for over 400 yards, coming within striking distance of breaking the FBS record for most yards rushed for in a game. He scored 8 touchdowns which tied the record for most FBS touchdowns by one player in a single game. Patterson's massive performance was done on only 36 carries throughout the game, with teammate Kevin Marks Jr. also getting 16 carries and recording 2 rushing touchdowns on his own. Patterson's impressive performance against Kent State earned him national attention and calls for him to be added to the watchlist for the Heisman Trophy. Buffalo defeated Kent State 70–41 and received 56 votes in week 14's AP Poll, coming within striking distance of a national ranking.

The following week, Buffalo was slated to play the Ohio Bobcats, but because of a COVID-19 outbreak on the Ohio football team, the game was canceled. Nevertheless, Buffalo increased their share of the vote in the AP Poll to 145, good for a No. 24 ranking in the poll. This was the first national ranking in Buffalo football program history.

Buffalo finished off their regular season on December 12 against Akron at UB Stadium. Jaret Patterson was sparsely used against Akron, receiving the entire second half of the game off. Patterson and Marks Jr. each recorded 2 rushing touchdowns each as Buffalo defeated Akron 56–7 and finished the regular season undefeated at 5–0. The Bulls once again increased their share of the vote in the AP Poll up to 186, good to jump up a position in the poll to No. 23.

Roster

Schedule
Buffalo originally had a game scheduled against Ohio State, but it was canceled due to the COVID-19 pandemic. Buffalo played a regular season consisting of games against MAC teams only.

Rankings

In week 12, Buffalo received votes in the AP Poll for the first time since the 2018 season. They were nationally ranked for the first time in program history when the week 15 poll was released, ranked at No.24 in the AP Poll. The following week they were raised to No. 23.

Players drafted into the NFL

References

Buffalo
Buffalo Bulls football seasons
Camellia Bowl champion seasons
Buffalo Bulls football